Shaqlawa is a historic city and a hill station in the Erbil Governorate in the Kurdistan Region of Iraq. Shaqlawa, a city of approximately 25,500 people, lies 51 km to the northeast of Erbil, at the bottom of Safeen mountain. Shaqlawa is situated between Safeen mountain and Sork mountain, and sits 1066 m above sea level. The city is known for its waterfalls, trees, and greenery.

Climate
Shaqlawa has a Mediterranean climate (Csa) with very hot summers and relatively cold, wet winters. Subfreezing highs are very common in the winter, which would present frost. Snowfall is not uncommon.

See also

References

Cities in Iraqi Kurdistan
District capitals of Iraq
Populated places in Erbil Governorate
Assyrian communities in Iraq
Tourist attractions in Iraqi Kurdistan
Kurdish settlements in Iraq